<onlyinclude>

June 2021

See also

References

killings by law enforcement officers
 06